Ian Hale (born 4 December 1950) is an Australian sports shooter. He competed at the 1984 Summer Olympics and the 1988 Summer Olympics.

References

External links
 

1950 births
Living people
Australian male sport shooters
Olympic shooters of Australia
Shooters at the 1984 Summer Olympics
Shooters at the 1988 Summer Olympics
Place of birth missing (living people)
Commonwealth Games medallists in shooting
Commonwealth Games gold medallists for Australia
Commonwealth Games silver medallists for Australia
Commonwealth Games bronze medallists for Australia
Shooters at the 1982 Commonwealth Games
Shooters at the 1994 Commonwealth Games
20th-century Australian people
21st-century Australian people
Medallists at the 1982 Commonwealth Games
Medallists at the 1994 Commonwealth Games